Prastio is a village located in the Limassol District of Cyprus, near the village of Kellaki, northeast of Limassol.

References

Communities in Limassol District